Esajas Zweifel (27 March 1827 – 27 February 1904) was a Swiss politician and President of the Swiss Council of States (1885/1886).

External links 
 
 

1827 births
1904 deaths
People from the canton of Glarus
Swiss Calvinist and Reformed Christians
Free Democratic Party of Switzerland politicians
Members of the National Council (Switzerland)
Members of the Council of States (Switzerland)
Presidents of the Council of States (Switzerland)